Nathan Taylor may refer to:
Nathan Taylor (footballer) (born 1990), English footballer
Nathan C. D. Taylor (1810–1887), American politician
Nat Taylor (1906–2004), Canadian inventor
Nate Taylor (born 1976), American filmmaker
Nathan Taylor, aka Paris, fictional character
Nat Taylor (footballer) (born 1992), British footballer
Nat Taylor (American football) (1927–2006), American football player
Nathan Taylor (sprinter) (born 1983), Canadian track and field athlete

See also
Nathaniel Taylor (disambiguation)